Central Malaita was a single-member constituency of the Legislative Council, Governing Council, Legislative Assembly and National Parliament of Solomon Islands between 1967 and 1993. It was abolished when Parliament was increased in size from 38 to 47 seats. Its final MP, Francis Joseph Saemala, was re-elected in the Aoke/Langalanga constituency in the 1993 general elections.

List of MPs

Election results

1989

1984

1980

1976

1973

1970

1967

References

Legislative Council of the Solomon Islands constituencies
Governing Council of the Solomon Islands constituencies
Legislative Assembly of the Solomon Islands constituencies
Defunct Solomon Islands parliamentary constituencies
1967 establishments in the Solomon Islands
Constituencies established in 1967
1993 disestablishments in the Solomon Islands
Constituencies disestablished in 1993